Guaanzhuang station is a station on the  of the Beijing Subway, and is located in the Guanzhuang area of Chaoyang District.

In future, it will be a transfer station with Line 22 (Pinggu line) which is currently under construction.

History 

Guaanzhuang station opened on December 27, 2003. The installation of automatic platform gates started on August 9, 2012, and finished in September 2012.

Name conflict 
This station had the same English name as a station on Line 15, also part of the Beijing Subway system.

In December 2019, the  station on Batong line changed spelling to Guaanzhuang.

Station layout 
The station has 2 elevated side platforms.

Exits 
There are 6 exits, lettered A1, A2, A3, A4, B1, and B2. Exits B1 and B2 are accessible.

References

External links

Beijing Subway stations in Chaoyang District
Railway stations in China opened in 2003